Adne may refer to:

Adne Sadeh, a mythical creature alluded to in Jewish folklore
Ådne Søndrål, (10 May 1971) Norwegian speed skater 
Ådne Nissestad, (18 November 1995) Norwegian football goalkeeper
Adne van Engelen, (16 March 1993) Dutch cyclist